Calabar South is a Local Government Area of Cross River State, Nigeria. Its headquarters are In the town of Anantigha.
 
It has an area of 264 km and a population of 191,630 at the 2006 census.

The postal code of the area is 540.

The local Government Headquarter is in Anantigha.

There are 11 local Government wards.

References

Local Government Areas in Cross River State
Populated coastal places in Nigeria